Inosine-5'-monophosphate dehydrogenase 1, also known as IMP dehydrogenase 1, is an enzyme that in humans is encoded by the IMPDH1 gene.

Function 

IMP dehydrogenase 1 acts as a homotetramer to regulate cell growth. IMPDH1 is an enzyme that catalyzes the synthesis of xanthine monophosphate (XMP) from inosine-5'-monophosphate (IMP). This is the rate-limiting step in the de novo synthesis of guanine nucleotides.

Clinical significance 

Defects in the IMPDH1 gene are a cause of retinitis pigmentosa type 10 (RP10).

See also 
 IMP dehydrogenase

References

Further reading

External links
  GeneReviews/NCBI/NIH/UW entry on Retinitis Pigmentosa Overview
 

EC 1.1.1